Swedish Open is a tennis tournament.

Swedish Open may also refer to:

Swedish Open (badminton)
Swedish Open (table tennis)
Swedish Open (squash)
Swedish Open (darts)